Jock Palfreeman (born 13 November 1986) is an Australian who was convicted of murder and sentenced to 20 years in a Bulgarian prison. Palfreeman was serving in the British Army at the time of the incident.

The event
In the early hours of 28 December 2007, 21-year-old Jock Palfreeman was involved in an incident during which Bulgarian student Andrei Monov was fatally stabbed. According to the case file, Monov received a single stab wound to the side of his chest, while 19-year-old Antoan Zahariev received a slash wound to the side of his torso. Palfreeman was injured after being hit in the head and arm with pieces of concrete pavement tiles.

Monov and Zahariev had been out with over a dozen other youths. Palfreeman claimed he saw the group chase two Roma. When he saw the group start attacking one of the Roma, he ran across a downtown square to help the victim. When the attack then turned on him, he pulled a knife from his pocket and waved it around to scare the youths away. However, instead of running away the youths continued to attack him as he tried to move the group away from the Roma.

Palfreeman admitted carrying a large butterfly knife when he went out drinking in Sofia.

After being arrested, Palfreeman told the police that he was living in a sack in Borisova Gardens and that he didn't know the name of the English couple he had been with that night. In fact, he was living at their house at Madjare, 60 km from Sofia. This allowed Lindsay Welsh, who had been present at the murder, to leave the country the next day. She was never questioned by police nor did she appear at court.  Palfreeman did not provide the details until told by Graham Saunders that Welsh had left the country. When Welsh made a statement about the events that night, she claimed she had seen nothing as she was helping someone recharge the credit on a mobile phone. Graham Saunders spoke to Palfreeman before he was interviewed by the police, and claims he had left his girlfriend with Palfreeman and gone to a hotel for the night. He therefore claimed he hadn't seen anything or had any involvement.

Palfreeman pleaded not guilty based on self defence. Prosecutor Parvoleta Nikova argued that Palfreeman attacked the group of youths for no reason. In an interview given to 24 Chassa before the trial began, she claimed Palfreeman was guilty as charged and should receive a life sentence.

The event in Bulgaria was not the first time Palfreeman had been accused of a stabbing. In 2004, he was named by victims James Atack and Matthew Faunt as the offender in a stabbing attack at a party in Chatswood (a suburb of Sydney). Police investigated but no charges were laid due to a lack of evidence. This stabbing incident was raised during Palfreeman's trial.

Monov had a blood alcohol reading of 0.29%. Zahariev's reading was 0.18%, and Palfreeman's was 0.015% in his blood and 0.026% in his urine.

Among the mourners at Andrei Monov's funeral were head of the Supreme Court of Cassation, Lazar Gruev and members of the ruling Socialist Party, including soon to be Interior Minister Mihail Mikov, and former legal advisor to the President Chavdar Georgiev.

The criminal trial was held concurrently with the crime's compensation case, which is the usual procedure in Bulgaria. The civil claimants were Antoan Zahariev and Andrei Monov's parents, notary Aksenia Monova and psychologist Hristo Monov.

During the trial, some of the youths and police officers changed their versions of events, claiming there were no Roma and no altercation in the lead-up to Andrei Monov's death. When the defence tried to show that this contradicted what the youths had told the police first at the scene and police investigators, the civil claimants and the prosecutor were able to prevent examination of those accounts.
On 3 December 2009, the Sofia City Court found Palfreeman guilty and sentenced him to 20 years' imprisonment.

Appellate court appeal
Palfreeman's friends and family supported his case since the initial incident and organized a rally ahead of his appeal. The defence asked the appellate court to allow further examination of traffic recordings, which it argued supported the sequence of events put forward by Palfreeman and witnesses. The defence also asked for a review of the forensic evidence. Both requests were rejected. However, the court allowed re-examination of some of the witnesses who had changed their versions of events at trial. A change in law meant that civil claimants were no longer able to block the defence's use of original witness statements in its questioning. Palfreeman's lawyers raised issues such as the failure of the trial court to take into account the evidence of witnesses who were not associated with Monov.

On 24 February 2010, the court upheld the conviction and sentence. On 27 July 2011, the Bulgarian Supreme Court of Cassation also upheld the conviction and sentence.

Bulgarian Prisoners Association
As chairman of the Bulgarian Prisoners Association, Palfreeman has offered legal advice to fellow inmates. As a result, his privileges were revoked, leading him to begin a hunger strike on 13 January 2013. On 17 October 2013, Palfreeman said that he and 10 other foreign prisoners were subjected to a beating by a prison guard, which he believes was because the guard deliberately did not acknowledge his presence during roll call. Shortly after, the same guard allegedly beat him again, which Palfreeman has apparently reported to a lawyer, the Bulgarian Helsinki Committee and the Australian consulate. As of 23 December 2013 there have been no results reported on the findings of any investigation into the incidents. In November 2015, because of his work in upholding the legal rights of Bulgarian prisoners, Australian Caroline Staples selected Jock Palfreeman as a nominee for the "Person of the Year" award in Bulgaria, which was approved by the Bulgarian Helsinki Committee. This caused a storm of controversy in Bulgarian society, leading to protests of relatives, friends and other Bulgarians. The BHK eventually decided to withdraw Palfreeman's nomination. The renewed attention paid to the case in Bulgaria resulted in the production of a documentary, which featured an extensive interview with Palfreeman, during which he talked about his pursuits in prison, his place within Bulgarian society and recalled the events of late December 2007. He criticized a number of aspects of his trial and also claimed that he never wanted Andrei Monov to die.

Parole
In an interview published in November 2012, Palfreeman claimed he was being "held for ransom" by the Bulgarian government. He was subject to a court order from 2009 claiming restitution of 450,000 Bulgarian Lev (about A$ 375,000), which has increased with interest since his arrest. The Australian government requested that Palfreeman be transferred to Australia, according to the International Prisoner Transfer Agreement to which both Bulgaria and Australia are signatories. If transferred, Palfreeman would have served the remainder of his sentence in an Australian prison. However, the request was denied in July 2013, with the prosecutor's office stating that Palfreeman had violated regulations and had not served enough time to have been rehabilitated. The campaign for transfer continued in Australia, with journalist Belinda Hawkins, lawyer Julian Burnside and actor William McInnes speaking in support at a public meeting in Melbourne. The human rights organisation Bulgaria Helsinki Committee has condemned the decision not to transfer Palfreeman, speculating that there may be undue influence from the dead man's father, who is now a government MP.

Palfreeman made an application for parole in 2018, but withdrew it after Monov's father mounted a protest outside the courthouse and threatened to injure him if he was released. Another application for parole was rejected in early 2019. In April 2019, Palfreeman undertook a hunger strike to draw attention to his case, breaking it to see his grandfather who had travelled from Australia to visit in May.

On 19 September 2019, Palfreeman was unexpectedly granted parole by a panel of three judges at the Sofia Appellate Court, with Bulgarian Helsinki Committee President Dr Kanev saying, "The appeal court's decision is final ... It's a just decision. There is no reason for Jock Palfreeman not to be released on parole. He has served enough of his sentence – it's almost twelve years now."

Palfreeman was transferred to immigration detention while he waited for a new Australian passport. On 24 September, Bulgaria's prosecutor general, Sotir Tsatsarov, made an application to the Supreme Court of Cassation to revoke Palfreeman's parole. Hristo Monov had asked the judges to explain their decision, which he called a "moral disgrace": "I invite them to meet, in front of the media and the whole society, to tell me why." Opposition leader Korneliya Ninova called the early release a "shame", while Prime Minister Boyko Borisov refused to comment directly. On 7 October, the Supreme Court of Cassation heard from the prosecutor and Palfreeman's lawyer, with the hearing adjourned for up to two months. Australia's Foreign Minister Marise Payne said, "I am concerned … that there may be a range of non-legal considerations … that are influencing this matter, and I want to be sure that the law is being applied consistently. I am strongly of the view that he should be treated in accordance with Bulgarian law and that he be allowed to return to Australia immediately." A public letter was signed by nearly 300 Bulgarian judges defending the decision to grant him parole.

Palfreeman was released from immigration detention on 16 October 2019 but was unable to leave the country due to a ban imposed in 2011. On 27 January 2020, Bulgarian National Television reported that the Sofia Administrative Court had overturned the travel ban; however, Palfreeman said he was still unable to leave the country as "The border police won't let me go" and he was still without a passport. As of the end of January 2020, the Supreme Court of Cassation, which had said on 7 October 2019 that it would rule on the appeal against his parole within two months, had not made any pronouncement as to the result of the appeal.

In April 2021, Palfreeman confirmed he had left Bulgaria but did not wish to disclose his location due to safety concerns.

References

External links
http://www.jockpalfreemancase.com
ABC Australian Story episode, part 1
ABC Australian Story episode, part 2
ABC national radio documentary "Hair of the Dog"
Fair Trials International profile of the case

Australian people imprisoned abroad
Living people
1986 births
Prisoners and detainees of Bulgaria
Australian expatriates in Bulgaria
Bulgarian human rights activists
Criminals from Sydney
People convicted of murder by Bulgaria
Hunger strikers